Wayne McDonald an Australian businessman and unelected president of the International Natural Bodybuilding Association. The Australian natural bodybuilding association was established in 1991.

Education
He earned an applied science degree from Victoria University in 1985 in the field of muscle growth. His research paper on muscle growth and body composition of female bodybuilders, was the world's largest research paper in this subject.

References

Australian chief executives
Australian company founders
Australian bodybuilders
Victoria University, Melbourne alumni
Living people
Year of birth missing (living people)